The Beer Heights Light Railway operates  of minimum gauge  track at Beer, Devon, England. It is part of Pecorama, an exhibition owned by Peco.

Overview
The official opening was by Rev. W.V. Awdry on 14 July 1975, at which time it offered a return ride from "Much Natter" station via a balloon loop. Subsequently, it was almost doubled in length by construction of the "Devil's Gorge" extension which involved a very considerable cutting and tunnel, and the complex track layout also includes a more recent steeply-graded branch line to "Wildway Down". The station at Deepwater was revamped in late 2014 and reopened in July 2015 as 'Deepwater Halt'. 

The line is notable for its high standard of presentation to the public and for the fine views obtainable from it. It is home to eight live steam locomotives designed on narrow gauge principles.

Locomotives
The railway currently has eight steam locomotives, two diesel and one electric. A locomotive called 'Finn MacCool' also visits every summer (usually July – September) from the Belfast and County Down Miniature Railway Society, Northern Ireland, to help out in the peak season. Other locomotives also visit during the 'Loco Week' and 'Bank Holiday Weekend Gala' in August. A list of locomotives currently in use is below:

References

External links

 Beer Heights Light Railway website

1975 establishments in England
Railway lines opened in 1975
Heritage railways in Devon
Miniature railways in the United Kingdom
7¼ in gauge railways in England